Magic Hour is the third album by the English band Cast, released in 1999. "Beat Mama" and the title track were both released as singles, and reached number nine and number 28 on the UK Singles Chart respectively.

Critical reception 

Mike DeGagne of AllMusic gave praise to Power's songwriting being "way above 1997's Mother Nature Calls" and his musicianship being "extremely sharp" throughout the track listing, while also highlighting Peter Wilkinson's performance as "more professional and [more] focused" than with his other bands, concluding that: "Even though none of the songs can match the strength of "Guiding Star" […] Magic Hour still stands up as the group's second best recording."

In a retrospective review, Jamie Atkins of Record Collector said the album and its successor Beetroot showcase a band attempting to "break new ground [...] It all just lacks wit, imagination and conviction".

Track listing 

Note
 "Hideaway" ends at 6:40. After 13 minutes of silence (6:40–19:40), the hidden song "What You Gonna Do?" begins, which is an instrumental version of "Alien" conducted by David Arnold.

Personnel 
Cast
 John Power – vocals, guitar
 Peter Wilkinson – backing vocals, bass
 Liam "Skin" Tyson – guitar
 Keith O'Neill – drums

Production
 Gil Norton – producer, mixing
 Danton Supple – engineer, mixing
 David Arnold – string arrangements
 Nicholas Dodd – conductor
 Bob Ludwig – mastering

Chart performance

References

External links 
 [ Magic Hour at Billboard]

1999 albums
Cast (band) albums
Polydor Records albums
Albums produced by Gil Norton